I Like Only You (French: Je n'aime que toi) is a 1949 French comedy film directed by Pierre Montazel, and starring by Luis Mariano, Martine Carol and André Le Gall.  It was shot at the Cité Elgé Studios in Paris. The film's sets were designed by the art director Jean d'Eaubonne.

Synopsis
Irène is married to the celebrated singer Renaldo Cortez who is completely devoted to his work. Frustrated she goes off with another man and Renaldo enlists the help of his faithful friend Arthur to return her to him so they can reconcile.

Cast 

 Luis Mariano as Renaldo Cortez, singer, husband of Irène
 Martine Carol as Irène, wife of Don Renaldo
 André Le Gall as Gérard
 Robert Dhéry as Arthur Bidois
 Raymond Bussières as Ernest
 Annette Poivre as Julia, maidservant of Don Renaldo
 Edmond Ardisson as Le chauffeur
 Louis de Funès as pianist of the orchestra
 René Berthier as Le secrétaire
 Jean Richard as Un passager de l'avion 
 Gaston Orbal as 	Le maître d'hôtel 
 Joé Davray as 	Un garçon de café 
 Roger Saget as 	Le présentateur 
 Pierrette Rossi as Une admiratrice
 Colette Georges as Une admiratrice
 Paul Azaïs as 	Le compositeur 
 Colette Brosset as	Monrival
 Jean Carmet as Le père affolé 
 Roger Pierre as Un journaliste d'Ici Paris 
 Jean-Marc Thibault as 	journaliste d'Ici Paris

References

Bibliography
 Goble, Alan. The Complete Index to Literary Sources in Film. Walter de Gruyter, 1999.
 Powrie, Phil & Cadalanu, Marie . The French Film Musical. Bloomsbury Publishing, 2020.

External links 
 
 Je n’aime que toi (1949) at the Films de France

1949 films
French comedy films
1940s French-language films
French black-and-white films
Films directed by Pierre Montazel
1949 comedy films
1940s French films
French films based on plays